Winstedt is a surname. People with that name include:
 Eric Otto Winstedt (1880-1955), British Latinist and gypsiologist; brother of Richard
 Richard Olaf Winstedt (1878-1966), English Orientalist and colonial administrator; brother of Eric and husband of Sarah
 Sarah Winstedt (1886-1972), Irish-born physician, surgeon and suffragist; wife of Richard

See also
 Winstead (disambiguation)
 Winsted (disambiguation)